YVE may refer to:

 YVE, the IATA code for Vernon Regional Airport, British Columbia, Canada
 YVE, the station code for Yarraville railway station, Victoria, Australia